This is a list of techno-thriller novels, novel series, and collections of linked short stories.

Significant techno-thriller authors and works

References

External links
 ‘Techno-thriller’ Novels and Recent American Intellectual History
 Most Shelved Techno Thriller Books on Goodreads
 Top Rated Techno Thriller Books on Goodreads

 
Lists of novels
Lists of books by genre